Aquipuribacter  is a bacterial genus from the family Intrasporangiaceae.

References

Further reading 
 

Intrasporangiaceae
Bacteria genera